"Just Wanna Dance" / "Weekend" is a 1988 release by the Todd Terry Project. In the U.S., "Just Wanna Dance" was released as the A-side and made it to number one on the Dance chart for one week. In the UK and Europe, "Weekend" was released as the A-side with "Just Wanna Dance" as the B-side. It peaked at No. 56 on the UK Singles Chart. In 1995, a re-release of new mixes of "Weekend" charted higher in the UK, peaking at No. 28.

References

1988 singles
Todd Terry songs
1988 songs
Sleeping Bag Records singles